Ryskeldi Artykbaev (born 9 April 2001 in Bishkek) is a Kyrgyz professional footballer who plays for Alay Osh, and the Kyrgyzstan national team.

Club career
Artykbaev is a graduate of the Dordoi Bishkek Academy. He made his unofficial first-team debut in a 10–1 friendly victory over FC Zhivoye Pivo on 20 August 2018. He scored his first goal in the match also.

International career
In June 2019 Artykbaev competed with the Kyrgyzstan U20 team at the 2019 Granatkin Memorial tournament in Saint Petersburg, Russia. He scored against India in a penalty shootout on the way to securing a 10th-place finish in the competition. He also scored against Greece in the group stage. Later that year he was part of the squad again for 2020 AFC U-19 Championship qualification and scored against the United Arab Emirates in the eventual 2–0 victory. In March 2021 he appeared for the national U23 side against the senior teams of Bangladesh and Nepal in a friendly tournament in Kathmandu, Nepal.

Artykbaev was named to Kyrgyzstan's senior roster for the 2021 Three Nations Cup held in Bishkek in September 2021. He made his senior international debut in his team's second match, coming on as a second-half substitute for Eldar Moldozhunusov against Bangladesh on 7 September. Kyrgyzstan won the match 4–1.

International career statistics

References

External links
 
 
 
 FC Dordoi Bishkek profile
 AFC profile

2001 births
Living people
Kyrgyzstani footballers
Kyrgyzstan international footballers
Association football forwards
FC Dordoi Bishkek players